The Aciliu Viaduct is a viaduct located on the route of the  long Orăștie-Sibiu section of the A1 Motorway between Orăștie in Hunedoara County and Sibiu in Sibiu County, Romania. More precisely it is located between the commune of Apoldu de Jos and the town of Săliște both located in Sibiu County in central Romania.

The viaduct is one of the largest structures along the length of the A1 Motorway and is the longest and the highest viaduct in Romania. The fifth pylon is the highest of the structure, reaching  from top to bottom.

The structure's deck is constructed out of 20 copper combined reinforced steel U-beams weighing an average 385 tonnes each, with the largest weighing up to 400 tonnes, resulting in a total steel usage of around 8000 tonnes for the entire structure. The company responsible for the construction of the Aciliu viaduct is Impregilo subcontractor Collini. The total cost of the  highway section containing the viaduct, which runs between Cunța and Săliște, is around €142 million.

See also
A1 Motorway
Roads in Romania
List of bridges in Romania

References

Buildings and structures in Sibiu County
Bridges in Romania
Viaducts in Romania